Kilrush is an unincorporated place and former railway point in geographic Boulter Township in the Unorganized South Part of Nipissing District in northeastern Ontario, Canada. Kilrush is located northwest of the northwest side of Algonquin Provincial Park on Kilrush Lake in the Amable du Fond River drainage basin.

It lies on the now-abandoned Canadian National Railway Alderdale Subdivision, a section of track that was originally constructed as the Canadian Northern Railway main line, between Fossmill to the west and Coristine to the east.

References

Other map sources:

Communities in Nipissing District